Fuerteventura–Canarias was a UCI Professional Continental cycling team based in Spain. The team was founded in late 2006 ready to compete in the 2007 season, as a follow-up of the Comunidad Valenciana cycling team. The team was managed by Jorge Sastre with Oscar Guerrero and Rufino Murguia assisting. As of 2008 they are no longer a UCI Professional Continental team.

2007 team

References

External links

Defunct cycling teams based in Spain
Cycling teams established in 2007
Cycling teams disestablished in 2008